Suellyn Lyon (July 10, 1946 – December 26, 2019) was an American actress. She joined the entertainment industry as a model at the age of 13, and later rose to prominence and won a Golden Globe for playing the title role in the film Lolita (1962). Her other film appearances included The Night of the Iguana (1964), 7 Women (1966), Tony Rome (1967), and Evel Knievel (1971).

Life and career
Suellyn Lyon was born on July 10, 1946, in Davenport, Iowa. She was the youngest of five children, and her father died before her first birthday. Soon after, her mother, Sue Karr Lyon, moved the family to Dallas, then to Los Angeles.

When she was 14 years old, she was cast in the role of Dolores "Lolita" Haze in Stanley Kubrick's film Lolita (1962), starring with James Mason, then aged 53. Nabokov, the book's author, described her as the "perfect nymphet". She was chosen for the role partly because the film makers had to alter the age of the character to an older adolescent rather than the 12-year-old child Lolita in Vladimir Nabokov's novel Lolita. Although Kubrick's film altered the story so as not to be in violation of the Hollywood Production Code, it was still one of the most controversial films of the day.

Lyon was 15 when the film premiered in June 1962, too young to watch the film. She became an instant celebrity and won a Golden Globe Award for Most Promising Newcomer—Female. She recorded two songs for the film, released on an MGM 45-rpm record. The song "Lolita Ya Ya" (Riddle–Harris) appeared on side A, and "Turn Off the Moon" (Stillman-Harris) appeared on side B.

Lyon was cast as a seductive teenager in John Huston's The Night of the Iguana (1964), competing for the affections of disgraced preacher Richard Burton against the likes of Deborah Kerr and Ava Gardner. She played a mission worker in 7 Women (1965), director John Ford's last feature film. Lyon played the female lead in the comedy The Flim-Flam Man (1967) and had a supporting role in Tony Rome (1967), which starred Frank Sinatra. She played the wife of daredevil Evel Knievel in the film Evel Knievel (1971). By the 1970s, she was relegated to mainly secondary roles. In her final film, she played a news reporter in Alligator (1980).

Personal life
Lyon was married five times. Her 1973 marriage to Cotton Adamson in a Colorado state prison where he was incarcerated for robbery and second-degree murder was contentious and ended in 1974 when the recently released Adamson committed another hold-up. She was also the partner of Scottish singer-songwriter Donovan during the mid-1960s.

Her daughter from her marriage with Roland Harrison, Nona Harrison Gomez ( Nona Merrill Harrison), was born in Los Angeles in 1972.

Death
Lyon died in West Hollywood on the morning of December 26, 2019, at the age of 73. While no specific cause of death was given, she was reported to have been in poor health "for some time".

Filmography

Film

Television

References
 15: http://www.angelfire.com/la2/annettecentral/ - filmography, photos (confirmed link)

External links
 

1946 births
2019 deaths
Actresses from Iowa
American child actresses
American expatriates in Spain
American women pop singers
American film actresses
American television actresses
MGM Records artists
New Star of the Year (Actress) Golden Globe winners
Actors from Davenport, Iowa
20th-century American actresses
20th-century American women singers
20th-century American singers
21st-century American women